Carrozzeria Castagna is an Italian coachbuilding company based in Milan, Italy.

History
The company history began in 1849 when Carlo Castagna bought the Ferrari coachbuilding business. Carrozzeria Castagna built the first coach automobile with a 
combustion engine (Benz quadricycle). 

Later the company worked with larger car manufacturers, including: Isotta Fraschini, Duesenberg, Alfa Romeo, Lancia, and Mercedes-Benz. The original company ceased in 1954.

Revival
The company name was revived twice in the 1990s. In 1994, the Carrozzeria Castagna name was bought by a businessman Uberto Petra and Gioacchino Acampora, the latter an Italian automotive designer who created all of the recent projects of Castagna Milano, starting from the re-body of an Alfa Romeo SZ as an Alfa Romeo Vittoria Castagna. The latest works of the company include a series of customised runabout and wood-panelled cars based on Fiat 500 and Mini.

List of cars designed by Gioacchino Acampora at Castagna Milano:
 1995 Alfa Romeo Vittoria, based on Alfa Romeo SZ
 1995 Maserati Auge concept car, based on Maserati Quattroporte IV and revised in 2002
 2003 Castagna G.C., also called "Ginevra"
 2003 Castagna Rossellini, based on Ferrari 550 Maranello
 2004 Mini SUWagon
 2004 Mini Woody
 2005 Castagna Aria, based on Ferrari 575M
 2005 Bentley Continental GT Shooting Brake
 2005 Mini CrossUP
 2005 Mini Tender
 2006 Castagna Imperial Landaulet
 2007 Fiat 500 Woody Wagon
 2007 Castagna Aznom, based on Chevrolet Corvette
 2008 Fiat Tender Two EV, based on Fiat 500
 2015 Fiat 500C Ischia
 2016 Fiat 500L Tiberio Taxi

References

External links 
Castagnamilano.com: Castagna Milano website
Coachbuild.com Encyclopedia: Castagna

Coachbuilders of Italy
Milan motor companies
Isotta Fraschini
Vehicle manufacturing companies established in 1849
Vehicle manufacturing companies disestablished in 1954
1849 establishments in the Austrian Empire
1954 disestablishments in Italy
Re-established companies